Pokrzywnica Wielka  is a village in the administrative district of Gmina Janowiec Kościelny, within Nidzica County, Warmian-Masurian Voivodeship, in northern Poland.

The village has a population of 200.

References

Pokrzywnica Wielka